Kendal Ucar (born 3 September 1981) is a Turkish French-born footballer.

Ucar began his professional career with FC Sochaux-Montbéliard, but he would only make two appearances for the club in Ligue 2. He moved to Ionikos F.C. in July 2002, where he would play six seasons in the Greek Super League, playing in over 150 games and scoring over 20 goals. Kendal Ucar is now retired and living in Los Angeles, CA, USA, where he continues to play and coach soccer.

References

1981 births
Living people
French footballers
French expatriate footballers
FC Sochaux-Montbéliard players
SR Delémont players
Ionikos F.C. players
Ethnikos Asteras F.C. players
OFI Crete F.C. players
Iraklis Thessaloniki F.C. players
Super League Greece players
Expatriate footballers in Switzerland
Expatriate footballers in Greece
French people of Turkish descent
Association football midfielders